"Morning in LA" is a song by English band White Lies. It was released as the third single from their fourth studio album, Friends, on 29 September 2016.

Music video 
The music video for "Morning in LA" was released on 17 November 2016. The music video features montages of the band playing and of the city of Los Angeles. The video was directed by Chris Hugall.

Hugall described the music video as a "tongue-in-cheek homage to all things 80s goth-pop", in reference to the band gothic rock roots. The production company for the music video was Nice & Polite and it was produced by Matt Frost and Ross Anderson.

In a staff article for Dork magazine, the music video was described as an "80's reboot".

Charting

References 

2016 singles
2016 songs
White Lies (band) songs
BMG Rights Management singles
Songs about Los Angeles